Citizen Cope is the eponymous second album by American recording artist Citizen Cope. It was released on January 29 2002, making it his only album for DreamWorks Records. The record boasts a lengthy cast of session musicians, most of whom are veterans and produced by Bob Power.

The first single from the album "Contact" featured bass playing from Me'Shell Ndegeocello. Most of the bass on the album was played by Preston Crump, a session musician who was previously known for playing on songs produced by the production team Organized Noize. The song "Let the Drummer Kick" was featured in the 2006 ensemble comedy Accepted as well as the 2005 Samuel L. Jackson film Coach Carter. The track can be heard in the ending sequence of S1E12 of CSI Miami, air date January 6, 2003. The track can also be heard in the "Cannes Kids' episode, season 4 of Entourage.

Track listing

Personnel
 Drums: Abe Laboriel, Jr., Jay Nichols, Paul "Buggy" Edwards, Omar Hakim, Aaron Burroughs
 Drum Programming: Clarence Greenwood, Bob Power, Michael "Funky Ned" Neal, Neal H. Pogue
 Bass: Me'Shell Ndegeocello, Bob Power, Preston Crump, Michael "Funky Ned" Neal, Daniel Parker
 Piano: John Ginty (acoustic), Bob Power (electric)
 Percussion: Bashiri Johnson
 Keyboards: Kenneth Wright, Bob Power, Clarence Greenwood
 Organ: John Ginty
 Guitar: Clarence Greenwood, Bob Power 
 Turntable: John Connolly
 Cello: Jesse Levy
 Additional vocals: Michelle Lewis, Peter Davies

References

External links

2002 albums
Citizen Cope albums
DreamWorks Records albums